The East Lake Sammamish Trail is an  recreational rail trail in King County, Washington that runs along Lake Sammamish from Marymoor Park in Redmond, through Sammamish, to Gilman Boulevard in Issaquah.

History
The trail had initially encountered fierce political resistance from nearby homeowners through whose property the former BNSF Railway right-of-way runs. An interim trail, with a packed gravel surface suitable for walking and mountain biking, had been scheduled for completion by January 2006.

After losing a federal lawsuit brought by the Cascade Land Conservancy and Friends of the East Lake Sammamish Trail before the U.S. Ninth Circuit Court of Appeals, however, the homeowners relented, and the trail was finally completed and opened on 21 March 2006.

References

External links

 City of Sammamish - East Lake Sammamish Trail
 King County trail site
 Cascade Land Conservancy
 Bike Trails of the Pacific Northwest article

Rail trails in Washington (state)
Parks in Sammamish, Washington
Protected areas of King County, Washington
Transportation in King County, Washington